W. John McDonald (born September 29, 1936) is a Canadian physicist and academic administrator. He served as acting president of the University of Alberta from 1994 to 1995. He was educated at the University of Saskatchewan (BSc 1959, MSc 1961) and University of Ottawa (PhD 1964). A physicist, he specializes in sub-atomic physics and particle detection techniques. He joined the University of Alberta's Department of Physics in 1962 as a professor. From 1982 to 1992, he was the Dean of Science, and from 1991 to 1994, he was Vice President (Academic) of the University. He was made professor emeritus in 2002. He married Wendy Macleod in 1961 and has three children.

References

1936 births
Living people
Presidents of the University of Alberta
Scientists from Lethbridge
Canadian physicists
University of Saskatchewan alumni
University of Ottawa alumni
Presidents of the Canadian Association of Physicists